Oxodipine is a calcium channel blocker.

Calcium channel blockers
Dihydropyridines
Carboxylate esters
Benzodioxoles